Belvès (Languedocien: Belvés) is a former commune in the Dordogne department in southwestern France. On 1 January 2016, it was merged into the new commune Pays-de-Belvès.

It has been designated as one of the prettiest towns in France. The nearest city is Bordeaux.

Population

Notable inhabitants
Jacques Rispal, (1 August 1923 – 9 February 1986) was a French film actor. He appeared in 100 films between 1952 and 1986.

See also
Communes of the Dordogne department

References

Former communes of Dordogne
Plus Beaux Villages de France